Rumaucourt is a commune in the Pas-de-Calais department in the Hauts-de-France region of France.

Geography

Population
The inhabitants are called Rumaucourtois.

Places of interest
 The church of St. Amand, rebuilt, along with most of the village, after World War I.
 The German World War I cemetery.
 The Commonwealth War Graves Commission cemetery.

See also
 Communes of the Pas-de-Calais department

References

External links

 The CWGC communal cemetery

Communes of Pas-de-Calais